Flaviaesturariibacter terrae is a Gram-negative, rod-shaped, aerobic and non-motile bacterium from the genus of Flaviaesturariibacter which has been isolated from mountain soil.

References

External links
Type strain of Flaviaesturariibacter terrae at BacDive -  the Bacterial Diversity Metadatabase

Chitinophagia
Bacteria described in 2017